Sergo Kukhianidze (born 23 April 1999) is a Georgian footballer who plays as a forward for Samgurali Tskhaltubo and the Georgia national team.

Career
Kukhianidze is a former Georgian youth international. In May 2021, Georgia national team head coach Willy Sagnol named him in the squad for friendlies against Romania and Netherlands. He made his debut on 6 June in a 0–3 defeat against Netherlands.

Career statistics

International

References

External links
 

1999 births
Living people
Association football forwards
Footballers from Georgia (country)
Georgia (country) international footballers
Georgia (country) under-21 international footballers
Erovnuli Liga players